Ayzar Talantbekovich Akmatov (born August 24, 1998) is a Kyrgyz professional footballer who plays for Abdysh-Ata Kant in the Kyrgyz Premier League and Kyrgyzstan national football team as a defender.

Career
Akmatov spent the 2017 & 2018 seasons on loan at Alga Bishkek, returning to Dordoi Bishkek prior to the start of the 2019 season.

After spending the 2020 season with Alga Bishkek, Akmatov returned to Dordoi Bishkek for the 2021 season.

In 2021, He signed for Bangladesh Football Premier League side Sheikh Russel KC on Asian quota.

International
Akmatov made his debut for Kyrgyzstan national football team in a friendly match on September 10, 2018 against Syria. He was included in Kyrgyzstan's squad for the 2018 Asian Games in Indonesia, and the 2019 AFC Asian Cup in the United Arab Emirates.

Career statistics

International
Statistics accurate as of match played 20 December 2018

References

External links

1998 births
Living people
Sportspeople from Bishkek
Kyrgyzstan international footballers
Kyrgyzstani footballers
Association football defenders
FC Alga Bishkek players
FC Dordoi Bishkek players
Sheikh Russel KC players
Bangladesh Football Premier League players
FC Abdysh-Ata Kant players
Footballers at the 2018 Asian Games
2019 AFC Asian Cup players
Asian Games competitors for Kyrgyzstan
Outfield association footballers who played in goal